DeGroot learning refers to a rule-of-thumb type of social learning process. The idea was stated in its general form by the American statistician Morris H. DeGroot; antecedents were articulated by John R. P. French and Frank Harary. The model has been used in physics, computer science and most widely in the theory of social networks.

Setup and the learning process 
Take a society of  agents where everybody has an opinion on a subject, represented by a vector of probabilities . Agents obtain no new information based on which they can update their opinions but they communicate with other agents. Links between agents (who knows whom) and the weight they put on each other's opinions is represented by a trust matrix  where  is the weight that agent  puts on agent 's opinion. The trust matrix is stochastic, its rows consists of nonnegative real numbers, with each row summing to 1.

Formally, the beliefs are updated in each period as

so the  th period opinions are related to the initial opinions by

Convergence of beliefs and consensus 

An important question is whether beliefs converge to a limit and to each other in the long run. 
As the trust matrix is stochastic, standard results in Markov chain theory can be used to state conditions under which the limit

 
exists for any initial beliefs . The following cases are treated in Golub and Jackson 
 (2010).

Strongly connected case 

If the social network graph (represented by the trust matrix) is strongly connected, convergence of beliefs is equivalent to each of the following properties:
 there is a unique left eigenvector  of   corresponding to eigenvalue 1 whose entries sum to 1 such that, for every ,   for every  where  denotes the dot product.
The equivalence between the last two is a direct consequence from Perron–Frobenius theorem.

General case 

It is not necessary to have a strongly connected social network to have convergent beliefs, however,
the equality of limiting beliefs does not hold in general.

We say that a group of agents  is closed if for any ,  only if  . Beliefs are convergent if and only if every set of nodes (representing individuals) that is strongly connected and closed is also aperiodic.

Consensus 

A group  of individuals is said to reach a consensus if  for any . This means that, as a result of the learning process, in the limit they have the same belief on the subject.

With a strongly connected and aperiodic network the whole group reaches a consensus.
In general, any strongly connected and closed group  of individuals reaches a consensus for every initial vector of beliefs if and only if it is aperiodic. If, for example, there are two groups satisfying these assumptions, they reach a consensus inside the groups but there is not necessarily a consensus at the society level.

Social influence 

Take a strongly connected and aperiodic social network. In this case, the common limiting belief is determined by the initial beliefs  through

where  is the unique unit length left eigenvector of  corresponding to the eigenvalue 1. The vector  shows the weights that agents put on each other's initial beliefs in the consensus limit.

The eigenvector property  implies that 

Hence influential agents are characterized by being trusted by other individuals with high influence.

Examples 
These examples appear in Jackson  (2008).

Convergence of beliefs 

Consider a three-individual society with the following trust matrix:

Hence the first person weights the beliefs of the other two with equally, while 
the second listens only to the first, the third only to the second individual.
For this social trust structure, the limit exists and equals

. In words, independently of the initial beliefs, 
individuals reach a consensus where the initial belief of the first and the second person has twice as
high influence than the third one's.

Non-convergent beliefs 

If we change the previous example such that the third person also listens exclusively to the first
one, we have the following trust matrix:

In this case for any  we have

and 

so  does not exist and 
beliefs do not converge in the limit. Intuitively, 1 is updating based on 2 and 3's beliefs while
2 and 3 update solely based on 1's belief so they interchange their beliefs in each period.

Asymptotic properties in large societies: wisdom 

It is possible to examine the outcome of the DeGroot learning process in large societies,
that is, in the  limit.

Let the subject on which people have opinions be a "true state" . Assume that individuals
have independent noisy signals  of 
(now superscript refers to time, the argument to the size of the society).
Assume that for all  the trust matrix  is such that the 
limiting beliefs  exists independently from the initial beliefs. 
Then the sequence of societies  is called wise if

where  denotes convergence in probability.
This means that if the society grows without bound, over time they will have a common and accurate 
belief on the uncertain subject.

A necessary and sufficient condition for wisdom 
can be given with the help of influence vectors. A sequence of societies is wise if and only
if

that is, the society is wise precisely when even the most influential individual's influence vanishes in the 
large society limit. For further characterization and examples see Golub and Jackson (2010).

References 
 
 
 
 
 

Social learning theory